n-Butyllithium C4H9Li (abbreviated n-BuLi) is an organolithium reagent.  It is widely used as a polymerization initiator in the production of elastomers such as polybutadiene or styrene-butadiene-styrene (SBS).  Also, it is broadly employed as a strong base (superbase) in the synthesis of organic compounds as in the pharmaceutical industry.

Butyllithium is commercially available as solutions (15%, 25%, 1.5 M, 2 M, 2.5 M, 10 M, etc.) in alkanes such as pentane, hexanes, and heptanes.  Solutions in diethyl ether and THF can be prepared, but are not stable enough for storage. Annual worldwide production and consumption of butyllithium and other organolithium compounds is estimated at 2000 to 3000 tonnes.

Although butyllithium is colorless, n-butyllithium is usually encountered as a pale yellow solution in alkanes. Such solutions are stable indefinitely if properly stored, but in practice, they degrade upon aging. Fine white precipitate (lithium hydroxide) is deposited and the color changes to orange.

Structure and bonding

n-BuLi exists as a cluster both in the solid state and in a solution.  The tendency to aggregate is common for organolithium compounds.  The aggregates are held together by delocalized covalent bonds between lithium and the terminal carbon of the butyl chain.  In the case of n-BuLi, the clusters are tetrameric (in ether) or hexameric (in cyclohexane). The cluster is a distorted cubane-type cluster with Li and CH2R groups at alternating vertices.  An equivalent description describes the tetramer as a Li4 tetrahedron interpenetrated with a tetrahedron [CH2R]4. Bonding within the cluster is related to that used to describe diborane, but more complex since eight atoms are involved.  Reflecting its electron-rich character,  n-butyllithium is highly reactive toward Lewis acids.

Due to the large difference between the electronegativities of carbon (2.55) and lithium (0.98), the C−Li bond is highly polarized.  The charge separation has been estimated to be 55–95%.  For practical purposes, n-BuLi can often be considered to react as the butyl anion, n-Bu−, and a lithium cation, Li+.

Preparation
The standard preparation for n-BuLi is reaction of 1-bromobutane or 1-chlorobutane with Li metal:
 2 Li + C4H9X  →  C4H9Li  +  LiX  (X = Cl, Br)
If the lithium used for this reaction contains 1–3% sodium, the reaction proceeds more quickly than if pure lithium is used.  Solvents used for this preparation include benzene, cyclohexane, and diethyl ether.  When BuBr is the precursor, the product is a homogeneous solution, consisting of a mixed cluster containing both LiBr and BuLi, together with a small amount of octane.  BuLi forms a weaker complex with LiCl, so that the reaction of BuCl with Li produces a precipitate of LiCl.

Solutions of butyllithium, which are susceptible to degradation by air, are standardized by titration.  A popular weak acid is biphenyl-4-methanol, which gives a deeply colored dilithio derivative at the end point.

Applications
Butyllithium is principally valued as an initiator for the anionic polymerization of dienes, such as butadiene.  The reaction is called "carbolithiation":
 C4H9Li  +  CH2=CH−CH=CH2  →  C4H9−CH2−CH=CH−CH2Li
Isoprene can be polymerized stereospecifically in this way.  Also of commercial importance is the use of butyllithium for the production of styrene-butadiene polymers.  Even ethylene will insert into BuLi.

Reactions
Butyllithium is a strong base (pKa ≈ 50), but it is also a powerful nucleophile and reductant, depending on the other reactants.  Furthermore, in addition to being a strong nucleophile, n-BuLi binds to aprotic Lewis bases, such as ethers and tertiary amines, which partially disaggregate the clusters by binding to the lithium centers.  Its use as a strong base is referred to as metalation.  Reactions are typically conducted in tetrahydrofuran and diethyl ether, which are good solvents for the resulting organolithium derivatives (see below).

Metalation

One of the most useful chemical properties of n-BuLi is its ability to deprotonate a wide range of weak Brønsted acids.  t-Butyllithium and s-butyllithium are more basic. n-BuLi can deprotonate (that is, metalate) many types of C−H bonds, especially where the conjugate base is  stabilized by electron delocalization or one or more heteroatoms (non-carbon atoms).  Examples include acetylenes (H−CC−R), methyl sulfides (H−CH2SR), thioacetals (H−CH(SR)2, e.g. dithiane), methylphosphines  (H−CH2PR2), furans, thiophenes and ferrocene (Fe(H−C5H4)(C5H5)). In addition to these, it will also deprotonate all more acidic compounds such as alcohols, amines, enolizable carbonyl compounds, and any overtly acidic compounds, to produce alkoxides, amides, enolates and other salts of lithium, respectively. The stability and volatility of the butane resulting from such deprotonation reactions is convenient, but can also be a problem for large-scale reactions because of the volume of a flammable gas produced.

 LiC4H9 + RH →  C4H10 + RLi

The kinetic basicity of n-BuLi is affected by the solvent or cosolvent. Ligands that complex Li+ such as tetrahydrofuran (THF), tetramethylethylenediamine (TMEDA), hexamethylphosphoramide (HMPA), and 1,4-diazabicyclo[2.2.2]octane (DABCO) further polarize the Li−C bond and accelerate the metalation. Such additives can also aid in the isolation of the lithiated product, a famous example of which is dilithioferrocene.
Fe(C5H5)2  +  2 LiC4H9  +  2 TMEDA  →  2 C4H10  +  Fe(C5H4Li)2(TMEDA)2

Schlosser's base is a superbase produced by treating butyllithium with potassium t-butoxide. It is kinetically more reactive than butyllithium and is often used to accomplish difficult metalations. While some n-butylpotassium is present and is a stronger base than n-BuLi, the reactivity of the mixture is not exactly the same as isolated n-butylpotassium.

An example of the use of n-butyllithium as a base is the addition of an amine to methyl carbonate to form a methyl carbamate, where n-butyllithium serves to deprotonate the amine:
 n-BuLi + R2NH + (MeO)2CO → R2NCO2Me + LiOMe + BuH

Halogen–lithium exchange
Butyllithium reacts with some organic bromides and iodides in an exchange reaction to form the corresponding organolithium derivative.  The reaction usually fails with organic chlorides and fluorides:

 C4H9Li +  RX  →  C4H9X  +  RLi  (X = Br, I)

This lithium–halogen exchange reaction is useful for preparation of several types of RLi compounds, particularly aryllithium and some vinyllithium reagents. The utility of this method is significantly limited, however, by the presence in the reaction mixture of n-BuBr or n-BuI, which can react with the RLi reagent formed, and by competing dehydrohalogenation reactions, in which n-BuLi serves as a base:

 2 C4H9Br +  RLi  →  2 C4H9R  +  LiBr

 2 C4H9Li +  R′CH=CHBr  →  2 C4H10  +  R′C≡CLi  +  LiBr

These side reaction are significantly less important for RI than for RBr, since the iodine–lithium exchange is several orders of magnitude faster than the bromine–lithium exchange.  For these reasons, aryl, vinyl and primary alkyl iodides are the preferred substrates, and t-BuLi rather than n-BuLi is usually used, since the formed t-BuI is immediately destroyed by the t-BuLi in a dehydrohalogenation reaction (thus requiring two equivalents of t-BuLi).  Alternatively, vinyl lithium reagents can be generated by direct reaction of the vinyl halide (e.g. cyclohexenyl chloride) with lithium or by tin–lithium exchange (see next section).

Transmetalations
A related family of reactions are the transmetalations, wherein two organometallic compounds exchange their metals. Many examples of such reactions involve lithium exchange with tin:
 C4H9Li  +  Me3SnAr  →  C4H9SnMe3  +  LiAr  (where Ar is aryl and Me is methyl)
The tin–lithium exchange reactions have one major advantage over the halogen–lithium exchanges for the preparation of organolithium reagents, in that the product tin compounds (C4H9SnMe3 in the example above) are much less reactive towards lithium reagents than are the halide products of the corresponding halogen–lithium exchanges (C4H9Br or C4H9Cl). Other metals and metalloids which undergo such exchange reactions are organic compounds of mercury, selenium, and tellurium.

Carbonyl additions
Organolithium reagents, including n-BuLi are used in synthesis of specific aldehydes and ketones. One such synthetic pathway is the reaction of an organolithium reagent with disubstituted amides:
 R1Li  +  R2CONMe2 →   LiNMe2 + R2C(O)R1

Degradation of THF
THF is deprotonated by butyllithium, especially in the presence of TMEDA, by loss of one of four protons adjacent to oxygen.  This process, which consumes butyllithium to generate butane, induces a ring opening to give enolate of acetaldehyde and ethylene. Therefore, reactions of BuLi in THF are typically conducted at low temperatures, such as –78 °C, as is conveniently produced by a freezing bath of dry ice and acetone.  Higher temperatures (−25 °C or even −15 °C) are also used.

Thermal decomposition
When heated, n-BuLi, analogously to other alkyllithium reagents with "β-hydrogens", undergoes β-hydride elimination to produce 1-butene and lithium hydride (LiH):

 C4H9Li  → LiH  +  CH3CH2CH=CH2

Safety
Alkyl-lithium compounds are stored under inert gas to prevent loss of activity and for reasons of safety. n-BuLi reacts violently with water:
 C4H9Li  +  H2O  →  C4H10  +  LiOH
This is an exergonic and highly exothermic reaction. If oxygen is present the butane produced may ignite.

BuLi also reacts with CO2 to give lithium pentanoate:
 C4H9Li  +  CO2  →  C4H9CO2Li

See also
Propynyllithium, an organometallic compound.

References

Further reading
 FMC Lithium manufacturer's product sheets
 Environmental Chemistry directory
 Weissenbacher, Anderson, Ishikawa, Organometallics, July 1998, p681.7002, Chemicals Economics Handbook SRI International
 HPV test plan, submitted by FMC Lithium to EPA
 Ovaska, T. V. e-EROS Encyclopedia of Reagents for Organic Synthesis "n-Butyllithium." Wiley and sons. 2006. 
 Greenwood, N. N.; Earnshaw, A. Chemistry of the Elements, 2nd ed. 1997: Butterworth-Heinemann, Boston.

Organolithium compounds
Reagents for organic chemistry
Superbases
Butyl compounds